The Quiet Shore is 1958 war novel by the British writer Ernest Raymond. It returns to the subject of one of his best-known works Tell England, set during the Gallipoli campaign during the First World War. It addresses the theme of homosexuality which had been a subtext in the earlier novel.

Synopsis
Forty years after the costly landings, Gerry Browning returns to Gallipoli with his wife. While there he relives the terrible experiences and his intense admiration for a fellow officer.

References

Bibliography
 Greicus, M. S. Prose Writers of World War I. British Council, 1973 .
 Onions, John. English Fiction and Drama of the Great War, 1918–39. Springer, 26 Mar 1990 .
 Paris, Michael. First World War and Popular Cinema: 1914 to the Present. Edinburgh University Press, 2019.
 Schneider, Ralf & Potter, Jane. Handbook of British Literature and Culture of the First World War. Walter de Gruyter, 2021.

1958 British novels
Novels set in Turkey
British war novels
Novels by Ernest Raymond
Cassell (publisher) books
1950s LGBT novels
Works about the Gallipoli campaign